The Ballandean Division was a local government area on the Granite Belt, Queensland, Australia, close to the Queensland-New South Wales border. It only existed between 1879 and 1880.

History
Ballandean Division was one of the original divisions created by the Divisional Boards Act 1879 with a population of 2430.

On 25 June 1880, Ballanean Division was abolished and was absorbed into its northern neighbour Stanthorpe Division.

References

Ballandean Division
1879 establishments in Australia
1880 disestablishments in Australia